Civic Betterment is a small neighborhood located in Southeast Washington, D.C., on the border of Prince George's County, Maryland. It is triangular in area, bounded by G and Fitch Streets SE to the north, Benning Road SE to the southwest, and Southern Avenue to the southeast.

Neighborhoods in Southeast (Washington, D.C.)